A yield co or yieldco is a company that is formed to own operating assets that produce a predictable cash flow, primarily through long term contracts. Separating volatile activities (such as development, R&D, construction) from stable activities of operating assets can lower the cost of capital Yield cos are expected to pay a major portion of their earnings in dividends, which may be a valuable source of funding for parent companies which own a sizeable stake.

Yield cos are commonly used in the energy industry, particularly in renewable energy to protect investors against regulatory changes. They serve the same purpose as master limited partnerships (MLPs) and real estate investment trusts (REITs), which most utilities can't form due to regulatory constraints. Yield cos give investors a chance to participate in renewable energy without many of the risks associated with it.

The number of yield cos grew rapidly in 2013 and 2014 through initial public offerings. They include:
 NextEra Energy Partners
 NRG Yield
 Brookfield Renewable Energy Partners
 TransAlta Renewables 
 Pattern Energy Group
 Atlantica Yield PLC
 Hannon Armstrong Sustainable Infrastructure
 TerraForm Power
 TerraForm Global
 8point3 Energy Partners.
 Saeta Yield

There is also an ETF (Exchange Traded Fund) that was set up by Global X Funds under the ticker Symbol YLCO, which seeks investment results that correspond generally to the price and yield performance, of the Indxx Global YieldCo Index.

Benefits for parent companies 

Deutsche Bank mentioned several benefits of creating yield cos for their parent companies:

References

Corporate finance
Types of business entity